Jean Dionis du Séjour (born 21 September 1956, in Agen, Lot-et-Garonne), is a French politician from the former centrist UDF party. He is now member of the New Centre (NC).

Deputy of the first Lot-et-Garonne constituency from 2002 to 2012, he was elected mayor of Agen during the 2008 municipal election.

References

1956 births
Living people
People from Agen
Politicians from Nouvelle-Aquitaine
Union for French Democracy politicians
The Centrists politicians
Union of Democrats and Independents politicians
Deputies of the 12th National Assembly of the French Fifth Republic
Deputies of the 13th National Assembly of the French Fifth Republic
École Centrale Paris alumni